Alexander McKenzie Buchanan (March 1, 1805 – August 26, 1868) was a justice of the Louisiana Supreme Court from May 4, 1853, to May 6, 1862.

Born in New York City, Buchanan read law in the office of Louisiana Supreme Court Justice Isaac Trimble Preston, gaining admission to the bar in 1826. Buchanan was a judge of the Fourth District Court before his ascension to the supreme court bench. He later served as the city attorney for New Orleans from 1867 to 1868.

References

1805 births
1868 deaths
Lawyers from New York City
U.S. state supreme court judges admitted to the practice of law by reading law
Justices of the Louisiana Supreme Court
19th-century American judges
19th-century American lawyers